
Rao may refer to:

Geography 
 Rao, West Sumatra, one of the districts of West Sumatra, Indonesia
 Råö, a locality in Kungsbacka Municipality, Halland County, Sweden

Transport 
 Dr. Leite Lopes–Ribeirão Preto State Airport , IATA code RAO, serving Ribeirão Preto, Brazil

Fictional entities 
 Rao (comics), a fictional star in the DC Universe; Superman's planet Krypton revolved around it
 Rao (Greyhawk), god of peace, reason, and serenity in Dungeons & Dragons: World of Greyhawk
 Raō, the Japanese name for Raoh, a character in Fist of the North Star

Mathematics
 Cramér–Rao bound, a statistical concept
 Rao–Blackwell theorem, a theorem in statistics

Science 
 Rao (insect), a genus of wasps in the subfamily Platygastrinae
 Recent African origin of modern humans (RAO), a paleoanthropological theory
 Recurrent airway obstruction (RAO), a respiratory disease in horses
 Response amplitude operator (RAO), a function relating a response to an input given the input frequency

Titles
Rao (title), cognate Hindi variations of the (originally Hindu) title Raja(h)  
 Rao Bahadur, a title of honour issued by the British in India

Other uses
 Rao (Indian surname)
 Rao (Chinese surname)
 Rao language
 Rao's, an Italian restaurant in New York City, USA named after its founder, Joshua Anthony Rao